"We're All No One" is a song by Australian twin sisters Nervo featuring Dutch DJ and producer Afrojack and American DJ and producer Steve Aoki. The single was released digitally on 2 September 2011 in Australia and the United States and 16 December 2011 in Belgium. It was released in the United Kingdom and Ireland on 9 March 2012.

Music video
A music video to accompany the release of "We're All No One" was first released onto YouTube on 30 October 2011 at a total length of three minutes and forty-six seconds.

Track listing

Chart performance

Release history

References

2011 singles
2011 songs
Nervo (DJs) songs
Afrojack songs
Astralwerks singles
Song recordings produced by Nervo (DJs)
Songs written by Afrojack
Songs written by Miriam Nervo
Songs written by Olivia Nervo
Songs written by Steve Aoki
Steve Aoki songs